Seriqbuya (Uyghur: سېرىقبۇيا, USY: Сериқбуя, ULY: Sëriqbuya) or Serikbuya is a town in Maralbexi (Bachu) County, Kashgar Prefecture, Xinjiang, China. It is located on Provincial Road 215, on the left (northwestern) bank of the Yarkand River and about 180 kilometers to the east of the city of Kashgar.

Name
The name Seriqbuya is from the Uyghur language and means yellow sophora alopecuroides.

History
In 1950, Seriqbuya District was established.

In 1958, Seriqbuya became a commune.'

In 1967 during the Cultural Revolution, the commune was renamed Dongfanghong Commune (literally, 'The East is Red Commune').

In 1984, Seriqbuya Town was created.

In 2013, Seriqbuya was the site of the April 2013 Bachu unrest between ethnic Uyghurs on one side and Chinese government officials and police on the other.

Administrative divisions

Seriqbuya includes ten residential communities and twenty villages (Mandarin Chinese Hanyu Pinyin-derived names, except where Uyghur is provided):

Residential communities:
Kulebeixi, Yingbazha, Keruikebeixi, Wusitangboyi, Ayikule, Yingbage, Daqiakule, Humudanbeixi, Dunmaili, Xialelike

Villages:
Nuobeixi, Kala'aikenboyi, Yingmaili, Akewusitang,  Kekeligantale, Xiakele'awati, Tuogelake, Kunqibulong,  Kumusareyi, Pahemileke, Aketaikaisike, Akedunjiemi,  Kebaishitupu, Saikesantale, Boz'ëriq ( / Bozi'airike ), Ying'awati, Keyakelike, Kuremutuogelake, Yolwasqotan ( / Yaolewasikuotan ), Ketaikelike'

Demographics

, Seriqbuya's population was 98.6% Uyghur.

Economy
Seriqbuya is a traditional southern Xinjiang agricultural village and market town where as many as ten-thousand people meet to trade. The business skills of local traders are strong and many traders from Seriqbuya have migrated to Beijing and Shanghai. Nearby farms produce licorice and medicinal products as a specialty.

Historical maps
Historical English-language maps including Seriqbuya:

Notes

References

Kashgar Prefecture